Kangasniemi Church is a wooden church located in Kangasniemi, Finland. The church and the adjacent bell tower were both designed by Matti Salonen. The church was built in 1811–1814 and baptized on 1 January 1815 by Aron Molander. It accommodates approximately 1,500 people.

Gallery

References

External links 
short film called Valon kirkko, the church of light
 
Lutheran churches in Finland
Kangasniemi